Fulay may refer to:

Places
 Fulay, Abdasa, panchayat village in Abdasa Taluka, Kutch District, Gujarat, India
 Fulay, Bhuj, village in Bhuj Taluka, Kutch District, Gujarat, India
 Fulay, Nakhatrana, panchayat village in Nakhatran Taluka, Kutch District, Gujarat, India

See also
 Ahl Fulays, village in Abyan Governorate, Yemen